Pignari is a commune in the Cercle of Bandigara in the Mopti Region of Mali. The commune contains 19 villages and in the 2009 census had a population of 14,630. The main village (chef-lieu) is Baboye.

References

External links
.
.

Communes of Mopti Region